Alessandro Pesci (born 9 October 1960) is an Italian film cinematographer.

Born in Rome, Pesci studied cinematography at the Gaumount School of Cinema. He won the Nastro d'Argento for best cinematography for Nanni Moretti's film We Have a Pope. He was nominated to David di Donatello for best cinematography in 2007 with Napoleon and Me, in 2008 with Quiet Chaos and in 2012 with We Have a Pope.

References

External links 
 

1960 births
Film people from Rome
Italian cinematographers
Living people
Nastro d'Argento winners